The Rudawy Janowickie or Landeshut Ridge is a mountain range in Sudetes in Poland.

See also
Colourful lakelets

Sudetes
Geography of Lower Silesian Voivodeship